Metaspinolaelaps is a genus of mites in the family Laelapidae.

Species
 Metaspinolaelaps aelleni Till, 1958

References

Laelapidae